The Museum of Western Art may refer to:

 The National Museum of Western Art in Tokyo, Japan
 The Museum of Western Art (Kerrville, Texas) in Kerrville, Texas, United States
 The Leanin' Tree Museum of Western Art in Boulder, Colorado, United States
 the Museum of Western and Oriental Art in Kiev, Ukraine